Rihpojávri or Riehppejávri is a lake which lies in Storfjord Municipality in Troms og Finnmark county, Norway, just to the south of European route E8. The lake is a reservoir that has a dam on the north end. The water leaving the lake flows into the Rihpojohk river which then flows into the Skibotnelva.

References

Reservoirs in Norway
Storfjord
Lakes of Troms og Finnmark